The Rally of Nigerien Patriots (RPN-Alkalami) was a political party in Niger.

History
The party was established by former minister Ousmane Issoufou Oubandawaki on 14 May 2009. It received 0.9% of the vote in the October 2009 parliamentary elections, winning a single seat, taken by Oubandawaki. In 2010, Oubandawaki established the Alliance for Democratic Renewal, which the RPN merged into in 2011.

References

Defunct political parties in Niger
2009 establishments in Niger
Political parties established in 2009
2011 disestablishments in Niger
Political parties disestablished in 2011